Walter Torres Maldonado was the mayor of Peñuelas, Puerto Rico since 1997 to 2019.

References

External links
Walter Torres Profile on WAPA-TV

Living people
Year of birth missing (living people)
People from Peñuelas, Puerto Rico
Mayors of places in Puerto Rico